The Church of Jesus Christ of Latter-day Saints in Honduras refers to the Church of Jesus Christ of Latter-day Saints (LDS Church) and its members in Honduras. The first branch (small congregation) was formed in 1953. As of December 31, 2021, there were 183,405 members in 236 congregations in Honduras. Honduras had the third most LDS Church members per capita in North America, behind the United States and El Salvador.

History

A brief history can be found at LDS Newsroom (Honduras) or Deseret News 2010 Church Almanac (Honduras)

Missions

Temples

The Tegucigalpa Honduras Temple was dedicated on 17 March 2013. A second temple, located in San Pedro Sula, is under construction.

See also

Religion in Honduras

References

External links
Newsroom - Honduras
 ComeUntoChrist.org Latter-day Saints Visitor site
 The Church of Jesus Christ of Latter-day Saints Official site